is a male Japanese artist from Gifu Prefecture, Gifu, Japan, currently living in Saitama. He did the original character design for Wandaba Style and Close to: Inori no Oka, two visual novels. He is also notable for the illustration of the Official Another Story Clannad short story collection based on the visual novel Clannad.

Works

Artbooks
  (Media Works) - 
  (Media Works) -

Illustrations
 Angel Beats! -Track Zero- (monthly illustration of stories for related series at Dengeki G's Magazine)
 CLANNAD Official Another Story Hikari Mimamoru Sakamichi de (Media Works) -

Original character design

Anime
 Wandaba Style

Video Games
 Clannad: Hikari Mimamoru Sakamichi de - 2010
 Close to ~Inori no Oka~ - 2001
 D.C. II ~Da Capo II~ (Harimao's design) - 2006
 Narcissu: Side 2nd - 2007
 Tsugi no Giseisha wo Oshirase Shimasu - 2011

References

External links
GotoP's personal website 

Pixiv account

1969 births
Japanese illustrators
Living people